Donald Cameron McKenzie (9 June 1927 – 22 September 1987) was a Scottish professional footballer who played as an inside forward.

References

External links

1927 births
1987 deaths
Footballers from Glasgow
Scottish footballers
Association football inside forwards
Stonehouse Violet F.C. players
Rangers F.C. players
Grimsby Town F.C. players
Arbroath F.C. players
Stirling Albion F.C. players
English Football League players
Scottish Football League players